The Volage class  was a group of two screw corvettes built for the Royal Navy in the late 1860s. Both ships spent the bulk of their active service abroad. Volage spent most of her first commission assigned to the Detached or Flying Squadron circumnavigating the world and then carried a party of astronomers to the Kerguelen Islands to observe the Transit of Venus in 1874. The ship was then assigned as the senior officer's ship in South American waters until she was transferred to the Training Squadron during the 1880s.

Active served as the commodore's ship on the Cape of Good Hope and West Africa Station and her crew served ashore in both the Third Anglo-Ashanti and Zulu Wars. She was assigned to the Training Squadron in 1885 after a period in reserve. The sisters were paid off in 1898–99 and sold for scrap in 1904 and 1906, respectively.

Design and description
Sir Edward Reed, the Director of Naval Construction, was tasked to provide a combination of seaworthiness and speed for these ships. He gave the ships a high length-to-beam ratio to increase their speed, but this made the design less manoeuvrable. To offset this, the ends of the ships were narrowed to allow the rudder as much authority as possible even though this reduced buoyancy at the ends of the ship and caused the weights to be concentrated in the middle of the ship. The compromise proved to be successful and the design did not have a large turning circle. Admiral G. A. Ballard considered them to be "a definite step forward in the shipbuilder's art." Ballard considered their only real defect to be unsteadiness as gun platforms as their metacentric height was fairly high, which caused them to roll excessively, and they pitched quite a bit in a head sea due to the lack of buoyancy in the narrow bow. Bilge keels were later installed during one of their refits to curb their rolling motion.

They displaced  and had a burthen of 2,322 tons. Their iron hull was covered by a  layer of oak that was sheathed with copper from the waterline down to prevent biofouling. Watertight transverse bulkheads subdivided the hull. Their crew consisted of 340 officers and ratings.

The ships had one 2-cylinder steam engine driving a single  propeller.

The lower masts were made of iron, but the other masts were wood. Their funnel was semi-retractable to reduce wind resistance and the propeller could be hoisted up into the stern of the ship to reduce drag while under sail.

The ships were initially armed with a mix of 7-inch and 64-pounder 64 cwt rifled muzzle-loading guns. The six  guns and two of the four 64-pounders were mounted on the broadside while the other two were mounted on the forecastle and poop deck as chase guns. It was credited with the nominal ability to penetrate  armour. In 1879–80, ten BL 6-inch 80-pounder breech-loading guns replaced all the broadside weapons. Two carriages for  torpedoes were also added.

Ships

Volage was the first ship to be commissioned and was initially assigned to the Channel Fleet under the command of Captain Sir Michael Culme-Seymour, Bt. However, by the end of 1870, she was transferred to the Flying Squadron which circumnavigated the world. The ship returned to England at the end of 1872 and was given a lengthy refit. During this time, Volage was rearmed with eighteen 64-pdr 64 cwt guns. She recommissioned in 1874 to ferry an expedition to the Kerguelen Islands to observe the transit of Venus. The following year, the ship was assigned as the senior officer's ship for the South American side of the South Atlantic. Volage was ordered home in 1879 where she was refitted, rearmed and her boilers were replaced. The ship was assigned to the Training Squadron in the 1880s where she remained until it was disbanded in 1899. Volage was then paid off and sold for scrap in 1904.

Unlike her sister ship, Active was placed in reserve after completion until 1873 when she was commissioned to serve as the flagship of the Commander-in-Chief, Cape of Good Hope and West Coast of Africa Station, Commodore William Hewett. The ship participated in naval operations during the Third Anglo-Ashanti War of 1874 and some of her crew were landed to reinforce the forces ashore. Commodore Francis Sullivan replaced Hewett in 1876 and some of her officers and men participated in the Anglo-Zulu War of 1878–79 as part of the Naval Brigade. Sullivan remained in command until 1879 when the ship returned home to refit and rearm. Active was placed in reserve after the completion of her refit until she was selected in 1885 to be the commodore's flagship in the newly formed Training Squadron. The ship was paid off from this assignment in 1898 and sold for scrap in 1906.

Notes

Footnotes

Bibliography

 

Corvettes of the Royal Navy
Victorian-era corvettes of the United Kingdom